Juliette de Baïracli Levy (11 November 1912 – 28 May 2009) was an English herbalist and author noted for her pioneering work in holistic veterinary medicine. After studying veterinary medicine at the Universities of Manchester and Liverpool for two years, Bairacli Levy left England to study herbal medicine in Europe, Turkey, North Africa, Israel and Greece, living with Romani people, farmers and livestock breeders, acquiring a fund of herbal lore from them in the process, most notably from the Romani people. She wrote several well-known books on herbalism and nomadic living in harmony with nature, in addition to fiction and poetry illustrated by Olga Lehmann. After living for some time on the Greek island Kythira, de Baïracli Levy moved to an old age home in Burgdorf, Switzerland.

Partial bibliography
Medicinal Herbs: their use in Canine Ailments, London: A.P.Tayler & Co, 1943.
Look! The Wild Swans (novel), illustrated by Olga Lehmann, London: C.W. Daniel Co.; Manchester: Rochford, Bairacli Books, 1947.
Puppy Rearing by Natural Methods, New York: Sirius House, 1948.
The Cure for Canine Distemper, London: Fowler & Co., 1930, (revised and enlarged) 1950.
Herbal Handbook For Farm and Stable, London: Faber & Faber, 1952, 1963.
As Gypsies Wander: Being an account of life with gypsies in England, Provence, Spain, Turkey, London: Faber & Faber, 1962.
The Bride of Llew (novel), illustrated by Olga Lehmann, London: Faber & Faber, 1953.
Spanish Mountain Life: the Sierra Nevada, London: Faber & Faber, 1955.
The Complete Herbal Book for the Dog, London: Faber & Faber, 1955, 1975, 1984.
Wanderers in the New Forest, London: Faber & Faber, 1958, .
Summer in Galilee, London: Faber & Faber, 1959.
A Gypsy in New York, London: Faber & Faber, 1962.
A Herbal Handbook for Everyone, London: Faber & Faber, 1966.
The Natural Rearing of Children, London: Faber & Faber, 1970.
The Complete Herbal Handbook for the Dog and Cat, London: Faber & Faber, 1971.
Traveler's Joy, .
Nature's Children, .
Common Herbs for Natural Health, 
The Yew Wreath (a book of twenty poems), illustrated by Olga Lehmann.
The Willow Wreath (a book of twenty poems).
The Cypress Wreath (a book of twenty poems).
A Gypsy in New York (new edition, back in print), Woodstock, NY: Ash Tree Publishing, 2011 
Spanish Mountain Life (new edition, back in print), Woodstock, NY: Ash Tree Publishing, 2011 
Summer in Galilee (new edition, back in print), Woodstock, NY: Ash Tree Publishing, 2011

References

External links
 Juliette of the Herbs - documentary that encapsulates Bairacli-Levy's life and teachings, her various herbal medicine methodologies along with the importance of  Romani (Gypsy) culture in forming and shaping her knowledge and worldview, highlighting her intense love for animals, particularly cows and the Afghan Hound

1912 births
2009 deaths
British veterinarians
Herbalists
Women veterinarians
Alumni of the University of Manchester
Alumni of the University of Liverpool